"Hold the Girl" is a song by Japanese-British singer-songwriter Rina Sawayama. It was released on 27 July 2022 as the third single from Sawayama's second studio album of the same name.

Background and release 
In May 2022, Sawayama announced her second studio album, Hold the Girl was set for release on 2 September 2022. She then proceeded to release the singles "This Hell" and "Catch Me in the Air" in May and June, respectively. On July 21, Sawayama posted teasers for the title track on TikTok, with the caption "single out next week". Three days later, on July 24, Sawayama announced that "Hold the Girl" would release three days later on Wednesday, July 27. On the day of the song's release, she announced that the album would be pushed back from 2 September to 16 September due to "production issues", however promised a fourth single would be published before then.

Composition 
"Hold the Girl" is a "typically ambitious, multi-faceted pop song, addressing both the trauma and catharsis of moving forward in life. The song was written in late 2020 after an intense therapy session." Writing for Rolling Stone UK, Hannah Ewens wrote that "Hold the Girl" sees Sawayama singing with 2000s R&B vocals and "opens like a holy gesture to Madonna's 'Like a Prayer' and becomes an emotional dancefloor filler".

Music video 
An accompanying music video for "Hold the Girl" was released on 3 August 2022 and sees Sawayama "stuck in a time loop within the bounds of a 19th century farmhouse until she finally breaks free."

Personnel 
 Rina Sawayama – performer, songwriter
 Jonny Lattimer – songwriter
 Barney Lister – producer
 Clarence Clarity – producer

Charts

References 

2022 songs
Dirty Hit singles
Rina Sawayama songs
Songs written by Jonny Lattimer